Michael Sojourner (born October 16, 1953) is a retired American professional basketball player born in Germantown, Pennsylvania.

A 6'9" (2.05 m) power forward / center from the University of Utah, Sojourner played three seasons (1974–1977) in the National Basketball Association as a member of the Atlanta Hawks, where he played his entire professional career.  He averaged 8.7 points per game over three seasons.

Sojourner was drafted by the Atlanta Hawks in the 1st round (10th pick, 10th overall) of the 1974 NBA draft.

He is the younger brother of former ABA player Willie Sojourner.

External links

1954 births
Living people
African-American basketball players
Atlanta Hawks draft picks
Atlanta Hawks players
Centers (basketball)
Utah Utes men's basketball players
American men's basketball players
Basketball players from Philadelphia
21st-century African-American people
20th-century African-American sportspeople